The 1975 UCI Road World Championships took place from 27 to 31 August 1975 in Mettet and Yvoir, Belgium.

Results

Medal table

External links 

 Men's results
 Women's results
  Results at sportpro.it

 
UCI Road World Championships by year
UCI Road World Championships 1975
1975 in road cycling
Uci Road World Championships, 1975
Mettet
Yvoir